Au Sable is an unincorporated community and census-designated place (CDP) in the U.S. state of Michigan.  The population of the CDP was 1,453 at the 2020 census.  The community is located within Au Sable Township at the mouth of the Au Sable River along Lake Huron.

History
Au Sable was first settled in 1848 when Curtis Emerson and James Eldridge purchased land in the area.  The community was platted the next year.  A post office in Au Sable began operating on September 23, 1856 and was named for its location along the Au Sable River.  The community was replatted in 1867 and incorporated as a village in 1872.  Au Sable was the largest community in the county and incorporated as a city in 1889.  

At the 1890 census, the new city recorded a population of 4,328.  Most of the city was destroyed by forest fires in 1911, and the post office closed on December 15, 1912.  The city last recorded only 61 residents at the 1930 census.  The city surrendered its charter in 1931 and dissolved into an unincorporated community within Au Sable Township.

Geography

The community is located on the southside of the Au Sable River at its river mouth at Lake Huron.  The community of Oscoda is on the northside of the river.  Au Sable is served by Oscoda Area Schools.

Major highways
 runs south–north along the eastern edge of the community near Lake Huron.

Demographics

As of the census of 2000, there were 1,533 people, 626 households, and 430 families residing in the CDP. The racial makeup of the CDP was 96.41% White, 1.11% Black or African American, 0.33% Native American, 0.39% Asian, 0.07% from other races, and 1.70% from two or more races. Hispanic or Latino of any race were 0.65% of the population.

There were 626 households, out of which 31.8% had children under the age of 18 living with them, 55.1% were married couples living together, 9.9% had a female householder with no husband present, and 31.2% were non-families. 26.4% of all households were made up of individuals, and 14.1% had someone living alone who was 65 years of age or older.  The average household size was 2.43 and the average family size was 2.91.

In the CDP, the population was spread out, with 26.0% under the age of 18, 5.2% from 18 to 24, 26.7% from 25 to 44, 23.5% from 45 to 64, and 18.7% who were 65 years of age or older.  The median age was 41 years. For every 100 females, there were 98.3 males.  For every 100 females age 18 and over, there were 96.4 males.

The median income for a household in the CDP was $36,989, and the median income for a family was $41,667. Males had a median income of $27,500 versus $18,989 for females. The per capita income for the CDP was $21,035.  About 5.0% of families and 8.0% of the population were below the poverty line, including 12.7% of those under age 18 and 4.8% of those age 65 or over.

Notable people
 Jack Fournier, professional baseball player, scout, and collegiate coach, born in Au Sable.

References

External links
Au Sable and Oscoda Historical Society

Census-designated places in Michigan
Unincorporated communities in Michigan
Census-designated places in Iosco County, Michigan
Unincorporated communities in Iosco County, Michigan
Populated places established in 1849
1849 establishments in Michigan
Former villages in Michigan
Former cities in Michigan
Populated places on Lake Huron in the United States